Racing Blood is a 1926 American silent sports drama film directed by Frank Richardson and starring Robert Agnew, Anne Cornwall and John Elliott.

Synopsis
College student James Fleming discovers that his uncle has gambled away his inheritance on a horse race and then killed himself. Worse it was at the hands of the man whose daughter James is in love with. He goes to work as a journalist and loses touch with her. He acquires a horse, unknowingly the very animal whose victory led to his uncle's downfall. He plans to race it in a steeplechase, but when he is unable to qualify his former girlfriend takes over and rides it to victory before they reconcile.

Cast
 Robert Agnew as James Fleminng
 Anne Cornwall as Muriel Sterlinng
 John Elliott as John Sterling
 Clarence Geldert as Harris Fleming
 Charles Sellon as 'Doc' Morton 
 Robert Hale as Jockey Joe Brooks

References

Bibliography
 Connelly, Robert B. The Silents: Silent Feature Films, 1910-36, Volume 40, Issue 2. December Press, 1998.
 Munden, Kenneth White. The American Film Institute Catalog of Motion Pictures Produced in the United States, Part 1. University of California Press, 1997.

External links
 

1926 films
1920s sports films
American silent feature films
American horse racing films
Films directed by Frank Richardson
American black-and-white films
Gotham Pictures films
1920s English-language films
1920s American films
Silent sports films